The president of the Senate of the Democratic Republic of the Congo is the presiding officer in the Senate of the Democratic Republic of the Congo.

Below is a list of office-holders:

Citations

References 

 
 

Politics of the Democratic Republic of the Congo
 
Democratic Republic of the Congo, Senate